Gamma rays are a form of electromagnetic radiation. 

Gamma Ray may also refer to:
Gamma Ray (band), a German power metal band
Gamma Ray (EP), extended play recording by Queens of the Stone Age
"Gamma Ray" (song), by Beck
"Gamma Ray", a song by the German progressive rock band Birth Control
"Gamma Ray", a song by Circa Zero from Circus Hero

See also
Gama (disambiguation)
Gamma (disambiguation)